Ullmann is a German surname also associated with Ashkenazi Jews. It means "man from Ulm". 

Notable people with the surname include:
Alexander de Erény Ullmann (1850–1897), Hungarian deputy and political economist
Andrew Ullmann (born 1963), German physician and politician
Christoph Ullmann (born 1983), German ice hockey player
Emerich Ullmann (1861–1937), Austrian surgeon
Fritz Ullmann (1875–1939), German chemist
Gebhard Ullmann (born 1957), German jazz musician and composer
Harrison Ullmann (1936–2000), American journalist
Jeffrey Ullman (born 1942), American computer scientist 
Karl Ullmann (1796–1865), German Protestant theologian
Kostja Ullmann (born 1984), German actor
Linn Ullmann (born 1966), Norwegian author and journalist
Liv Ullmann (born 1938), Norwegian actress
Lisa Ullmann (1907–1985), German-British dance teacher
Martin Ullmann (born 1986), German footballer
Mona Ullmann (born 1967), Norwegian Paralympic athlete (no, it)
Myron E. Ullman (born 1946), American businessman
Regina Ullmann (1896–1961), Swiss poet
Shalom Ullmann (1755–1825), German-Hungarian Talmudist
Stephen Ullmann (1914–1976), Hungarian linguist
Viggo Ullmann (1848–1910), Norwegian educator and politician
Viktor Ullmann (1898–1944), Czech-Austrian composer, conductor and pianist
Vojtěch Ignác Ullmann (1822-1897), Czech architect
Walter Ullmann (1910–1983), Austrian-British medieval scholar
William Ludwig Ullmann (1908–1993), American suspected spy
Wolfgang Ullmann (1929–2004), German journalist, theologian, and politician
Jeffrey J. Ullmann (born 1954), American inventor, businessman

See also
Ullmann condensation, named after Fritz Ullmann
Ullmann's Encyclopedia of Industrial Chemistry, named after Fritz Ullmann
Ullmann reaction, in chemistry, named after Fritz Ullmann
Ullmann Spur
Ullmann Point, named after Ullmann Spur
Ullmannite, a mineral, named after Fritz Ullmann
Ullman
Ulmann
Ulman

German-language surnames
Jewish surnames
Yiddish-language surnames